Igor Khimanych is a retired Soviet and Ukrainian football player goalkeeper.

Career
Ihor Khimanych was born in Kryvyi Rih. In 1986, he made his debut in Zirka Kropyvnytskyi, for which he played 2 matches and disappeared from the radar of football specialists. He made his next attempt to gain a foothold in the team of masters in 1989, joining the Kolos Nikopol, but already in the same season he returned to his hometown, concluding an agreement with Hirnyk Kryvyi Rih. In the spring of 1995, Khimanych joined the Desna Chernihiv, the club in the city of Chernihiv. In the season 1996–97 with the club he won the Ukrainian Second League. At the end of 1999, he defended the colors of System-Borex Borodianka and later he played in the amateur championship for Fakel-GPZ Varva with the club he won the Chernihiv Oblast Football Championship in 2000.  In 2003 he moved to Smorgon in the Belarusian Premier League.

Coach Career
After he retired from playing football, in 2011 he was appointed as coach of Khujand and in 2012 for Pamir Dushanbe. In 2017, he moved to the position of goalkeeping coach of Arsenal Kyiv and in 2018 he was invited to be goalkeeper coach for Alliance Lypova.

Honours
Fakel Varva
 Chernihiv Oblast Football Championship 2001

Desna Chernihiv
 Ukrainian Second League: 1996–97

References

 

1966 births
Living people
Sportspeople from Kryvyi Rih
Soviet footballers
FC Desna Chernihiv players
FC Zirka Kropyvnytskyi players
FC Elektrometalurh-NZF Nikopol players
FC Fakel Varva players
FC Slavutych players
FC Systema-Boreks Borodianka players
FC Ros Bila Tserkva players
FC Khimik Severodonetsk players
FC Smorgon players
Ukrainian footballers
Ukrainian Second League players
Ukrainian expatriate footballers
Ukrainian expatriate sportspeople in Belarus
Expatriate footballers in Belarus
Association football goalkeepers